Susan Weller was archdeacon of Walsall from 2014. to 2019.

She was educated at the University of Leeds. A marine biologist by profession, she was ordained deacon in 1996; and priest in 1997. After a curacy in Caverswall she was at Wilnecote from 2000 to 2005. After that her ministry took her to Rio de Janeiro until 2011 when she came to Wednesfield.

References

1965 births
People educated at Wolfreton School
Alumni of the University of Leeds
English marine biologists
20th-century English Anglican priests
21st-century English Anglican priests
Living people
People from Beverley
Archdeacons of Walsall